The following is a list of oil refineries in India, per the Petroleum Planning and Analysis Cell of the Ministry of Petroleum and Natural Gas, Government of India, arranged in decreasing order of their capacity.

References

 *
Energy-related lists
Economy of India lists